This article contains an overview of the year 1988 in athletics.

International events
 African Championships
 Balkan Games
 European Indoor Championships
 Olympic Games
 World Cross Country Championships
 World Junior Championships

World records

Men

Carl Lewis finished behind Ben Johnson (9.79) who was disqualified for a failed drugs test
4 × 400 team equalled the record by the United States on October 20, 1968 by Vincent Matthews, Ron Freeman, Larry James and Lee Evans.Women

Many observers believe Griffith-Joyner's time of 10.49 should not have been accepted as a record due to excessive following wind
Christyakova equalled the previous record of 7.45m with a prior jump

Men's Best Year Performers

100 metresMain race this year: Men's Olympic 100 metres200 metresMain race this year: Men's Olympic 200 metres400 metresMain race this year: Men's Olympic 400 metres800 metresMain race this year: Men's Olympic 800 metres1,500 metresMain race this year: Men's Olympic 1,500 metresMile

3,000 metres

5,000 metresMain race this year: Men's Olympic 5,000 metres10,000 metresMain race this year: Men's Olympic 10,000 metresHalf Marathon

MarathonMain race this year: Men's Olympic MarathonRace Walking

110m HurdlesMain race this year: Men's Olympic 110m Hurdles400m HurdlesMain race this year: Men's Olympic 400m Hurdles3,000m SteeplechaseMain race this year: Men's Olympic 3,000m SteeplechaseHigh JumpMain competition this year: Men's Olympic High JumpLong JumpMain competition this year: Men's Olympic Long JumpTriple JumpMain competition this year: Men's Olympic Triple JumpDiscusMain competition this year: Men's Olympic Discus ThrowShot PutMain competition this year: Men's Olympic Shot PutHammer

Javelin (new design)Main competition this year: Men's Olympic Javelin ThrowPole VaultMain competition this year: Men's Olympic Pole VaultDecathlonMain competition this year: Men's Olympic DecathlonWomen's Best Year PerformersMain race this year: Women's Olympic 100 metres100 metres

200 metresMain race this year: Women's Olympic 200 metres400 metresMain race this year: Women's Olympic 400 metres800 metresMain race this year: Women's Olympic 800 metres1,500 metresMain race this year: Women's Olympic 1,500 metresMile

3,000 metresMain race this year: Women's Olympic 3,000 metres5,000 metres

10,000 metresMain race this year: Women's Olympic 10,000 metresHalf Marathon

MarathonMain race this year: Women's Olympic MarathonRace Walking

100m HurdlesMain race this year: Women's Olympic 100m Hurdles400m HurdlesMain race this year: Women's Olympic 400m HurdlesHigh JumpMain competition this year: Women's Olympic High JumpLong JumpMain competition this year: Women's Olympic Long JumpShot PutMain competition this year: Women's Olympic Shot PutDiscus throwMain competition this year: Women's Olympic Discus ThrowJavelin (old design)Main competition this year: Women's Olympic Javelin ThrowHeptathlonMain competition this year: Women's Olympic Heptathlon''

Births
January 17 — Anna Bulgakova, Russian hammer thrower
January 21 — Ashton Eaton, American decathlete
January 26 — Gilbert Yegon, Kenyan long-distance runner
April 29 — Jan Kudlička, Czech pole vaulter
May 20 — Yomara Hinestroza, Colombian sprinter
May 26 — Dani Samuels, Australian discus thrower
June 22 — Yekaterina Yevseyeva, Kazakh high jumper
July 5 — Vincent Chepkok, Kenyan long-distance runner
August 4 — Liam Zamel-Paez, Australian high jumper
August 10 — Robert Kiprono Cheruiyot, Kenyan marathon runner
August 24 — Matteo Galvan, Italian sprinter
August 29 — Harry Aikines-Aryeetey, English sprinter
September 5 — Chu Yafei, Chinese race walker
October 31 — Eglė Balčiūnaitė, Lithuanian middle distance runner
December 17 — David Rudisha, Kenyan middle distance runner

Deaths
July 8 — Ray Barbuti (83), American athlete (b. 1905)

References
 Year Lists
 1988 Year Rankings
 Association of Road Racing Statisticians

 
Athletics (track and field) by year